Veerawong Leksuntorn (born 5 December 1991) is a Thai professional footballer who plays as an attacking midfielder for Thai League 2 club Ayutthaya United.

References

External links
 

1991 births
Living people
Veerawong Leksuntorn
Association football midfielders
Veerawong Leksuntorn
Veerawong Leksuntorn
Veerawong Leksuntorn